Jerzy Janusz Opara (born 21 August 1948 in Warsaw) is a Polish sprint canoeist who competed in the 1970s. Competing in two Summer Olympics, he won a silver medal in the C-2 500 m event at Montreal in 1976.

Opara also won four medals at the ICF Canoe Sprint World Championships with two silvers (C-1 1000 m: 1970, C-2 1000 m: 1974) and two bronzes (C-2 500 m: 1973, C-2 1000 m: 1977).

References

1948 births
Canoeists at the 1972 Summer Olympics
Canoeists at the 1976 Summer Olympics
Living people
Polish male canoeists
Olympic canoeists of Poland
Olympic silver medalists for Poland
Olympic medalists in canoeing
Sportspeople from Warsaw
ICF Canoe Sprint World Championships medalists in Canadian
Medalists at the 1976 Summer Olympics